Heinrich Müller (1888 - May 11, 1957) was a Swiss football player and manager. He played most of the time for FC Winterthur and was the only member of the team which was part of the team in all three championship titles of the club in the years 1906, 1908 and 1917. He played for 10 matches for Switzerland national team. He managed for Switzerland national team in 1934 FIFA World Cup

References

1888 births
1957 deaths
Swiss men's footballers
Association football defenders
Switzerland international footballers
Swiss football managers
Switzerland national football team managers
People from Winterthur
FC Winterthur players
Torino F.C. players
Sportspeople from the canton of Zürich